is a Japanese actress.

Biography and personal life

Kuga was born in Tokyo, Japan. Her father, was a marquis and a member of the House of Peers.

In 1946, while still attending Gakushuin Junior High School, she became an actress for Toho studios. In June 1946, Toho had sponsored a search for "new faces", choosing Kuga as one of 48 new actresses and actors from 4,000 applicants. In 1947, she made her debut as one of the lead actresses in the omnibus movie . She was one of the actors active in the 1948 union strike at Toho studios. In the 1950s, she started working independently and starred in many productions of the Shochiku studios under the direction of Keisuke Kinoshita. Other important directors include Kenji Mizoguchi (The Woman in the Rumor), Yasujirō Ozu (Equinox Flower), and Tadashi Imai (An Inlet of Muddy Water). In 1954, she co-founded the film production company Ninjin Club (Bungei purodakushon ninjin kurabu) with actresses Keiko Kishi and Ineko Arima to enable better working conditions for actors within the studio system. Since the 1970s, she appeared mainly on television and on stage.

Kuga was married to actor Akihiko Hirata from 1961 until his death in 1984.

Selected filmography

Film
1948: Drunken Angel (dir. Akira Kurosawa)
1950: Until We Meet Again (dir. Tadashi Imai)
1951: The Idiot (dir. Akira Kurosawa)
1953: Older Brother, Younger Sister (dir. Mikio Naruse)
1953: An Inlet of Muddy Water (dir. Tadashi Imai)
1953: Love Letter (dir. Kinuyo Tanaka)
1954: The Woman in the Rumor (dir. Kenji Mizoguchi)
1954: The Garden of Women (dir. Keisuke Kinoshita)
1955: Shin Heike Monogatari (dir. Kenji Mizoguchi)
1956: The Rose on His Arm (dir. Keisuke Kinoshita)
1956: Farewell to Dream (dir. Keisuke Kinoshita)
1957: Yellow Crow (dir. Heinosuke Gosho)
1957: Elegy of the North (dir. Heinosuke Gosho)
1958: Equinox Flower (dir. Yasujirō Ozu)
1959: The Snow Flurry (dir. Keisuke Kinoshita)
1959: Good Morning (dir. Yasujirō Ozu)
1960: Cruel Story of Youth (dir. Nagisa Ōshima)
1961: Zero Focus (dir. Yoshitarō Nomura)
1961: The Story of Osaka Castle (dir. Hiroshi Inagaki)
1964: Whirlwind (dir. Hiroshi Inagaki)
1989: Godzilla vs. Biollante (dir. Kazuki Ohmori) (cameo)
1997: Toki o Kakeru Shōjo (dir. Haruki Kadokawa)

Television
1974–75: Karei-naru Ichizoku (NET)

Awards
1954: Mainichi Film Award for Best Supporting Actress
1956: Blue Ribbon Award for Best Supporting Actress
1994: Kinuyo Tanaka Memorial Award at Mainichi Film Awards
1995: The Golden Glory Award

References

External links

 
 

Japanese film actresses
1931 births
Living people
20th-century Japanese actresses
21st-century Japanese actresses